Zathura may refer to:

 Zathura, a 2002 children's book by Chris Van Allsburg
 Zathura: A Space Adventure, a 2005 film based on the book directed by Jon Favreau
 Zathura (document viewer), a document viewer named after the film
 Zathura (video game) based on 2005 film

See also
 Jumanji (disambiguation)
 Jumanji 2 (disambiguation)